The Colorado State Fair is an event held annually in late August in Pueblo, Colorado. The state fair has been a tradition since October 9, 1872.

The fairgrounds also host a number of other events during the rest of the year. Organizationally, the fair is one of the divisions of the Colorado Department of Agriculture.

History
When Colorado became a state in 1876, its state fair was already earning its place in history. In 1869, approximately two thousand people converged on what is now Pueblo for a horse exhibition; from that meager beginning was born the Colorado State Fair.

There were cancellations in 1917–18 and 1942–45. 2020 saw drive-thru fair food and limited exhibitions due to the COVID-19 pandemic.

In November 2019, the Colorado State Fair was audited by the Colorado General Assembly. As reported in local media, the audit found that the Fair had lost money for the previous 21 years in a row, with deficits averaging $4 million per year between 2014–2018.

See also

 Colorado Department of Agriculture

References

External links

 
 Colorado Events and Festivals

State fairs
Tourist attractions in Pueblo, Colorado
Festivals in Colorado
History of Colorado
Colorado culture
Annual fairs
August events
Fairs in the United States
Festivals established in 1872